U.S. Highway 71 (US 71) is a U.S. highway that runs from Krotz Springs, LA to the Fort Frances–International Falls International Bridge at the Canadian border. In Arkansas, the highway runs from the Louisiana state line near Doddridge to the Missouri state line near Bella Vista. In Texarkana, the highway runs along State Line Avenue with US 59 and partially runs in Texas (northbound traffic is in Arkansas and southbound in Texas). Other areas served by the highway include Fort Smith and Northwest Arkansas.

Route description

The route enters Arkansas near the Red River, and runs north through the communities of Doddridge and Fouke. Most motorists can now bypass US 71 from the Louisiana border to Texarkana via Interstate 49. Highway 71 has a brief concurrency with Highway 237 before crossing over The Loop Interstate 49 (former Interstate 130) in the southeast part of town.

Inside the loop, Highway 71 becomes East Street, passing the Texarkana Country Club and Hobo Jungle Park before becoming Hickory Street in downtown Texarkana. The street is four-lane undivided, passing the Bottoms House and J.K. Wadley House before meeting US 67/US 82. US 71 forms a short, two-block concurrency with US 67/US 82 before turning north along Hazel Street. This street runs northwest to intersect State Line Avenue. On State Line Avenue, the northbound lanes are in Arkansas, while the southbound lanes are in Texas. While on State Line Avenue, US 71 intersects Loop 14 (Texas Boulevard), in Texas, and Arkansas Boulevard, in Arkansas. Before US 59 joins US 71 at Interstate 30, nearly a mile north.

From Arkansas Highway 296 north of Texarkana to the Red River, US 71 runs concurrent with US 59 as a divided highway.

The highways re-enter Arkansas (specifically Little River County) completely at the Red River.  Less than a mile north of the River, all commercial truck traffic is required to pull into an Arkansas Highway Police weigh station.  US 59/US 71 serve as an eastern terminus for Highway 380 upon entering Ogden. Although US 59/US 71 bypass the community as a four-lane highway, the route formerly served Ogden as Grand Street, which as of 2016, retains original 1926 US 71 paving for some of its length. Following the Kansas City Southern Railroad tracks, US 59/US 71 enters Ashdown, where it becomes Constitution Avenue. As it heads north, the routes goes under Highway 32, entering the southern part of Ashdown, serving as Little River's county seat. The highway is named Constitution Avenue, and passes within two blocks of the Little River County Courthouse. The routes intersect with Highway 32B, Rankin Street, and Highway 108, before exiting town due north to Wilton. Entering Wilton, it passes the S.S.P. Mills and Son Building, Highway 234, and the Texarkana and Fort Smith Railway Depot. Just north of town a former alignment comes into view briefly before the Mills Cemetery and the Sevier County line.

Once across the Little River, US 59/US 71 passes another former alignment, crosses through Pond Creek National Wildlife Refuge, and runs east of Ben Lomond before entering Lockesburg. A junction in Lockesburg joins US 59/US 71 with US 371, with Highway 24 running west from the junction.  north of Lockesburg US 70 joins US 59/US 71/US 371, and the concurrent routes turn west to De Queen. Upon entering De Queen, US 59/US 71 turns north, US 70 continues west, US 70 Business/Highway 41 (US 70B/AR 41) runs south, and US 371 terminates at the junction. US 59/US 71 continue through Gillham and Grannis to serve as the western terminus of US 278 in Wickes. Junctions with Highway 246 and Highway 4 precede the route entering Mena, the county seat of Polk County.

In Mena, US 59/US 71 has a brief overlap with Highway 8, during which the routes pass two NRHP listings, the Mena Kansas City-Southern Depot and the Mena Commercial Historic District. US 59/US 71/AR 8 also has an overlap with Highway 88, although the western end of the overlap serves as the eastern terminus of the Talimena Scenic Drive National Scenic Byway designation. After Highway 8 and Highway 88 have left the route US 59/US 71 run north to a junction with US 270 in Acorn. At a fork in the road, US 59 splits onto US 270 west, and US 270 east begins a concurrency with US 71 northbound into Ouachita National Forest. US 71/US 270 continue into Scott County to Y City, where the concurrency ends and US 270 turns east. US 71 runs north through the forest to Waldron, a town the mainline route bypasses to the west while US 71B runs through downtown Waldron. While skirting Waldron, US 71 has a junction with Highway 272 near Waldron Municipal Airport as well as junctions with Highway 248, Highway 80, and Highway 28. This section of US 71 from north of Mena through Fayetteville (following the original sections bypassing the new Interstate 540 has been designated a scenic byway and the Boston Mountains Scenic Loop.

North of Waldron, US 71 passes through Mansfield and Greenwood before intersecting with Interstate 540 on the south end of Fort Smith. US 71 overlaps I-540 for approximately  until it reaches Interstate 40, then US-71 follows I-40  to Alma.

US 71 passes through Mountainburg, Winslow, West Fork and Greenland on its way to Fayetteville. At Fayetteville, US 71 overlaps I-49 to Bentonville, as well as U.S. Route 62.

North of Bentonville US 71 continues another  passing through Bella Vista to the Missouri state line.

History
US 71 between Bentonville and the Arkansas–Missouri state line north of Bella Vista was once known as Highway 100. Its northern terminus was at the Arkansas–Missouri state line where it continued as Route 88. By the mid-1960s, Highway 100 had been replaced by a new alignment of US 71.

National Register of Historic Places
Six historic segments of Highway 71 remain intact and are listed on the National Register of Historic Places in Arkansas. The Wilton, Little River approach, and Greenland segments were added in 2004, followed by the Jenny Lind segment in 2009. The Ogden and Ashdown segments were added in 2013.

All six listings are contained within the Arkansas Highway History and Architecture Multiple Property Submission, which preserves history from Arkansas's highway building era between 1910 and 1965.

Ogden
The Old US 71 – Ogden Segment is a former alignment of US 71 in Ogden, Arkansas. It is significant as a well-preserved example of concrete highway construction from the 1930s, built in a period when this was the preferred form of roadway surface.

Ashdown
The Old US 71 – Ashdown Segment is a former alignment of US 71 in Ashdown, Arkansas. It is significant as a well-preserved example of concrete highway construction from the 1930s, built in a period when this was the preferred form of roadway surface.

Wilton
The Old US 71 – Wilton Segment is a former alignment of US 71 near Wilton in Little River County, Arkansas.

Little River County began to grow with the coming of the railroad in the late nineteenth century. Towns were being established quickly, and railroads were springing up in the county. Millkin was established in 1890 and was renamed Wilton in 1892. The need for a bridge over the Little River became apparent to the county. A project to build a bridge was let in 1912, and the federal designation of US 71 came when Arkansas designated a state highway system in 1926.

The pavement for this section of US 71 was "Bates-type pavement". The winner of a high traffic contest in Bates, Illinois, Bates-type pavement is concrete with welded wire reinforcement. This type of pavement became very popular for high-volume highways in the 1930s.

The route served as a main artery in Little River County and as the main route between Texarkana and Fort Smith. The high traffic caused a settlement named Taylors Store to spring up north of Wilton, though it subsequently died out when this segment was bypassed in 1965. The route remains today as a drivable county road.

Little River approach
The Old US 71-Little River Approach is a largely abandoned former alignment of US 71 in southern Sevier County, Arkansas. Now designated Ashley Camp Road, it is a  section of road, extending south from Arkansas Highway 234 to the Little River. It parallels the existing alignment of US 71, which travels to the west of this road section. The road was built on fill in order to raise it above the floodplain of the Little River, and includes five period bridges built as reliefs in the event of river flooding. It is the longest and most-intact section of the original US 71 alignment in the county.

Jenny Lind
The Old US 71-Jenny Lind Segment is a stretch of historic road pavement southeast of Jenny Lind, Arkansas. It consists of a bypassed section of U.S. Route 71 (US 71) that is now designated Doraul Acres Lane. This roadway section was built 1927–29, when US 71 was first built. It was bypassed in 1959.

Greenland
The Old US 71 – Greenland Segment is a former alignment of US 71 near Greenland in Washington County, Arkansas.

Washington County began to grow with the coming of the railroad in the late nineteenth century. The St. Louis–San Francisco Railway (Frisco) came through the area in the 1870s and communities began forming quickly in the newly accessible area. Influential Fayetteville businessmen persuaded the railroad to come through the city rather than a western alignment through Prairie Grove. Rugby was founded in 1882, renamed Staunton, and would become Greenland by 1909.

Improvements came when the wagon road through the area was redesignated as part of the Jefferson Highway. Convict labor combined with a compulsory five days of labor required by law at the time to improve the gravel roadway. Now a route of national importance, the Jefferson Highway was eligible for inclusion in a federal paving program, and bridges were contracted through the Arkansas State Highway Commission. The federal designation of US 71 came when Arkansas designated a state highway system in 1926.

The route served as the main route between Fort Smith and Fayetteville. The high volume of traffic has caused the entire US 71 routing between Fort Smith and Fayetteville to be bypassed by Interstate 540 (I-540). This segment remains today as a drivable county road, Washington County Route 1194.

Historic segment gallery

Future
Most of US 71 will be bypassed by the northern extension of Interstate 49. The Missouri route has been completed, and continues near Pineville. The Bella Vista Bypass was completed October 1, 2021 and runs from Bentonville to Pineville and bypasses the town of Jane, Missouri. Also part of the I-49 extension, I-540 north of Alma has been replaced and resigned as Interstate 49.

Proposed southern extension ofI-49 from AR 22 to I-40. Groundbreaking began 2022 and construct is planned to start in late 2024 and should be completed by 2030.

Major intersections

See also
 
 
 
 
National Register of Historic Places listings in Little River County, Arkansas
National Register of Historic Places listings in Sebastian County, Arkansas
National Register of Historic Places listings in Sevier County, Arkansas
National Register of Historic Places listings in Washington County, Arkansas

Notes

References

External links

71
Transportation in Miller County, Arkansas
Transportation in Bowie County, Texas
Transportation in Little River County, Arkansas
Transportation in Sevier County, Arkansas
Transportation in Polk County, Arkansas
Transportation in Scott County, Arkansas
Transportation in Logan County, Arkansas
Transportation in Sebastian County, Arkansas
Transportation in Crawford County, Arkansas
Transportation in Washington County, Arkansas
Transportation in Benton County, Arkansas
Fort Smith, Arkansas
Interstate 49
 Arkansas
National Register of Historic Places in Little River County, Arkansas
National Register of Historic Places in Sebastian County, Arkansas
National Register of Historic Places in Sevier County, Arkansas
National Register of Historic Places in Washington County, Arkansas
Roads on the National Register of Historic Places in Arkansas